Otala punctata is a species of air-breathing land snail, a terrestrial pulmonate gastropod mollusk in the family Helicidae.

Distribution
This species occurs in the Mediterranean basin - Andorra, Spain, the Balearic Islands, France, Corsica, Sardinia and Malta	

This species is already established in the United States, and is considered to represent a potentially serious threat as  a pest, an invasive species which could negatively affect agriculture, natural ecosystems, human health or commerce. Therefore it has been suggested that this species be given top national quarantine significance in the USA.

Culinary
In southern Spain they are prepared in a typical dish, "cabrillas", cooked in spicy tomato sauce.

References

External links
Otala punctata    on the UF / IFAS Featured Creatures Web site

Helicidae
Gastropods described in 1774
Taxa named by Otto Friedrich Müller
Taxobox binomials not recognized by IUCN